is a Japanese manga series written and illustrated by Negi Haruba. It was serialized in Kodansha's Weekly Shōnen Magazine from August 2017 to February 2020, with its chapters collected into fourteen tankōbon volumes. The series follows the daily life of a high school student Futaro Uesugi, who is hired as a private tutor for a group of identical quintuplets: Ichika, Nino, Miku, Yotsuba, and Itsuki Nakano. At the very beginning of the story, it is shown that the events are being told in a flashback, while an adult Futaro prepares to marry one of the Nakano Quintuplets whose identity is only revealed near the end of the series.

The series is published in English by Kodansha USA under the Kodansha Comics imprint. The anime series is licensed in North America under a Crunchyroll–Funimation partnership. An anime television series adaptation produced by Tezuka Productions aired from January to March 2019 on TBS and other channels. A second season produced by Bibury Animation Studios aired from January to March 2021. The second season's sequel, The Quintessential Quintuplets Movie, was released as a film in May 2022.

The series was a commercial success; as of December 2022, the manga had over 20 million copies in circulation, making it one of the best-selling manga series. In 2019, the manga won the award for the shōnen category at the 43rd annual Kodansha Manga Awards.

Synopsis 

High school student Futaro Uesugi is an academically gifted student that leads a difficult life—his mother has died, he has no friends, and on top of all that, his father has incurred a large amount of debt.

An opportunity presents itself when the rich Nakano family transfers to his school. Futaro is promptly hired as a highly paid tutor. However, much to Futaro's dismay, he discovers that his five charges—identical quintuplet sisters of varied personalities—have no interest in studying at all and have abysmal grades. Some of the quintuplets are against having Futaro, whom they view as a stranger, in their apartment, but Futaro's diligent tenacity gradually convinces those girls to accept him and to improve their grades.

Throughout the series, Futaro develops special relationships with each of the quintuplets. Through a flashforward, it is revealed that he eventually marries one of them, but her true identity is only revealed near the end of the series.

Production 
The outline for a story about "a group of quintuplets falling in love with the same person" existed even before the serialization of Haruba's previous work, Karma of Purgatory (2014–2015), but was rejected by his editor-in-charge. A year later, as Karma of Purgatory was finishing, Haruba pitched various ideas to the editor, and the "quintuplets" concept was accepted. This was not without some reservations, as it had been viewed negatively in two to three of the serialization committees, so it was decided to have a one-shot manga published first. Said concerns were ultimately unfounded as the one-shot received positive reviews, and so was approved to become a serial.

Haruba finished drawing the last chapter on February 10, 2020.

Characters 
From the beginning, the initial idea was for the protagonists to be quintuplets, and although there were suggestions for the idea of quadruplets and sextuplets raised, it was rejected very quickly. 
When designing each of the quintuplets, He was inspired by 15 to 20 of his favorite existing female characters, as "some slice-of-life works only with girls".
As the characters were quintuplets, Haruba wanted a way to make them memorable to the reader (similar to how colour was used in 'Super Sentai  with Ichika (yellow), Nino (black), Miku (blue), Yotsuba (green), and Itsuki (red).), and just as the design was almost confirmed he had the idea of adding numbers in their names.

The hair colour of the Nakano quintuplets is different when being coloured, which was suggested by Haruba himself, such that they are more distinguishable from each other. The hair colour of the bride in the flashforward is, therefore, a colour-in-between.

 Story 
The flashforward showing that Futaro will eventually marry only one of the Nakano quintuplets was added in order to eliminate the possibility of Futaro marrying all five of them. It was also decided that all quintuplets would have negative feelings towards Futaro from the beginning, because Haruba wanted to write how their relationships improved from hate to love in the story, except Yotsuba, who acts as Futaro's guide for the development of the story.

While it is often the norm for harem romantic comedy manga to have sexualized depictions of characters, Haruba has said that he tried to avoid this to some extent after Vol. 1.  In his opinion, showing panties which are being worn, i.e. panchira, makes characters less mysterious and then less interesting to the readers. To keep the characters interesting, the sexy scenes were intended by him to be ambiguous but not straightforward, leading to readers' imagination. The swimsuit appearance of the Nakanos was finally revealed in Ep. 92 as Haruba thought an episode of swimsuits should exist before finishing the story.

 Media 
 Manga The Quintessential Quintuplets is written and illustrated by Negi Haruba. Before the serialization, a one-shot manga of the same name had been published in 2017 issue 8 of Kodansha's Weekly Shōnen Magazine on August 9, 2017, and received positive comments. On December 4, 2019, Haruba announced that the series would end on its 14th tankōbon volume. The series finished on February 19, 2020, with a total of 122 chapters.

The series has been published in English by Kodansha USA under their Kodansha Comics imprint digitally since June 28, 2018, with a line of physical releases beginning publication on January 1, 2019. By  August 2020 and July 2021 respectively, all fourteen volumes have been published digitally and physically.

The "all-color" version of the manga series began serialization in Kodansha's online manga platform MagaPoke (Magazine Pocket) on February 26, 2020.

 Commercial 
In October 2017, a television commercial for the manga was released where Ayane Sakura voiced all five girls.

 Anime 

An anime television series adaptation was announced in the combined 36th and 37th issue of Weekly Shōnen Magazine on August 8, 2018. The series is directed by Satoshi Kuwabara and written by Keiichirō Ōchi, featuring animation by Tezuka Productions, character designs by Michinosuke Nakamura and Gagakuga, and music by Natsumi Tabuchi, Hanae Nakamura, and Miki Sakurai. The series aired from January 10 to March 28, 2019 on the TBS, SUN, and BS-TBS channels. The series ran for 12 episodes. Crunchyroll streamed the series with Funimation providing the English dub as it airs. Although Tezuka Productions was the main animation studio behind the series, TBS producer Junichirou Tanaka stated that he asked for help from Shaft president Mitsutoshi Kubota for assistance in producing the series' 11th episode. It was ultimately decided that the studio would be outsourced to for the entire episode save for the episode's storyboards, which were drawn by series director Satoshi Kuwabara; however, all other animation, coloring, and compositing aspects of the episode were produced entirely at Shaft.

A second season was announced in a special event for the first season on May 5, 2019. Kaori is replacing Satoshi Kuwabara as the director of the season, and Keiichirō Ōchi is returning to write the scripts. Bilbury Animation Studios produced this season. It was originally scheduled to premiere in October 2020, but due to issues caused by the COVID-19 pandemic, the anime aired from January 8 to March 26, 2021.

After the second season finished airing, a sequel was announced. On April 18, 2021, the sequel was revealed to be a film. Masato Jinbo directed the film, with the main staff of the second season returning to reprise their roles. It was released in Japan on May 20, 2022.

For the first season, Kana Hanazawa, Ayana Taketatsu, Miku Itō, Ayane Sakura, and Inori Minase performed the opening theme song  as the group , while Aya Uchida performed the ending theme song "Sign".

For the second season, The Nakano Family's Quintuplets performed the opening theme song "Gotōbun no Katachi" and the ending theme song "Hatsukoi". Children's Playground Entertainment licensed the series in Southeast Asia and streamed it on Bilibili.

 Video games 
Characters from the series appeared in a collaboration event in the mobile video game Venus 11 Vivid!! from May 25 to May 31, 2019.

A mobile game based on the series titled  was released in 2020. The game will receive a console port for the PlayStation4 and Nintendo Switch developed by Mages under the title . It is set to launch in mid-2023 in Japan.

A visual novel titled  was developed by Mages for the PlayStation 4 and Nintendo Switch consoles. It features an original story in a deserted island setting, and was released on March 25, 2021 in Japan.

A visual novel based on the film, titled  was developed by Mages for the Nintendo Switch and PlayStation 4, and was released on June 2, 2022 in Japan.

A virtual reality game titled , also known as The Quintessential Quintuplets Memories VR: Itsuki Edition was developed by NextNinja and Blackc for Steam and Meta Quest. It was released in Japanese and English for Steam on October 12, 2022, and for Meta Quest on December 7, 2022.

 Exhibitions 
Multiple exhibitions were held across Japan starting from 2019, including Tokyo, Osaka, Niigata and Nagoya. Besides, an overseas exhibition was held in Taipei, Taiwan in July 2020.

 Reception 
 Sales The Quintessential Quintuplets had 2 million copies in circulation by January 2019; it reached 3 million copies in circulation by February 2019; it had over 15 million copies in circulation by April 2021. and over 16 million copies in circulation by March 2022. As of December 2022, it had sold over 20 million copies.

In Japan, the manga series was the fifth-best selling manga in 2019, and the third-best selling manga in the first half of 2020, placing after Demon Slayer: Kimetsu no Yaiba and One Piece.

 Critical response The Quintessential Quintuplets received positive reviews, most notably for its romantic comedy and harem elements. Paul Jensen of Anime News Network found the series enjoyable and rated a 4 out of 5 to the series, as he commented "The jokes are funny, the characters range from tolerable to likable, the fanservice doesn't go overboard, and there's no creepy or obnoxious plot point to spoil the party. There's nothing revolutionary about it, but it does a lot of basic things well without showing any major flaws, and that's enough to make this premiere good clean (well, clean-ish) fun." Patrick Frye of Monsters And Critics noted that there was "little to no ecchi shenanigans or degrading fan service and the girls move beyond the initial stereotypes and become fleshed-out characters that create a fun dynamic with the main character, Futaro Uesugi. Audiences are tired of watching a lucky everyman stumble his way through unlikely scenarios. Instead, Futaro’s no-nonsense attitude wins the day." Kyle Rogacion of Goomba Stomp praised the plot of the anime but criticized its art style and fanservice gags. The series has a current score of 4.6 out of 5 stars on Crunchyroll as of November 2020.

 Awards and nominations 
The series was nominated for the Next Manga Award 2018, organized by Niconico. It received 16,106 votes, eventually ranking eighth overall. In May 2019, it won the award for Best Shōnen Manga at the 43rd annual Kodansha Manga Awards, alongside To Your Eternity. On the award ceremony of the 43rd annual Kodansha Manga Awards, as one of the judges, Ken Akamatsu praised The Quintessential Quintuplets as "The ultimate complete version of harem bishōjo'' romantic comedy" with "very high quality of illustration".

Notes

References

External links 

  
  
  at Kodansha Comics 
 

2019 anime television series debuts
2021 anime television series debuts
2021 video games
Anime series based on manga
Bibury Animation Studios
Crunchyroll anime
Funimation
Harem anime and manga
Kodansha manga
Mages (company)
Nintendo Switch games
PlayStation 4 games
Romantic comedy anime and manga
School life in anime and manga
Shōnen manga
Tezuka Productions
TBS Television (Japan) original programming
Winner of Kodansha Manga Award (Shōnen)